Charidia is a genus of skippers in the family Hesperiidae.

Species
Recognised species in the genus Charidia include:
 Charidia lucaria (Hewitson, 1868)

References

Natural History Museum Lepidoptera genus database

Pyrginae
Hesperiidae genera
Taxa named by Paul Mabille